Bountiful High School is a public high school in Bountiful, Utah, United States, for grades 10 to 12. The school is one of eleven high schools in the Davis School District.

History
Bountiful High opened in 1951. It underwent reconstruction in 2013, and a new cafeteria and commons were built in place of an outdoor courtyard as well as the addition of air conditioning. Other remodels include new hallways, entrance, foyer, and bathrooms. A renovation of the parking lot was finished in 2015.

Mascot controversy
From its opening in 1951 to the end of the 2020–2021 school year, Bountiful High's mascot was the Braves. In July 2020, a petition circulated asking the Davis School District to retire the mascot. A separate petition to keep the mascot was started by an alum from Salt Lake City. School district spokesperson Christopher Williams announced on July 13 that principal Aaron Hogge indicated that the practice of having students at athletic events dressed up in Native American costumes would be discontinued. The controversy is part of a larger national issue about the use of Native Americans as mascots since the 1970s.
After months of deliberation and conversations between community members and the school and district administration, it was announced on November 30, 2020, that the Brave mascot would be retired. The community was allowed to vote for a replacement mascot from a list of potential new mascots compiled by the school. In April 2021, the school officially changed its name to "The Redhawks."

Academics
In 2020, the school had a 98% graduation rate and a total enrollment of 1,489 students. Bountiful High offers concurrent enrollment courses through Weber State University, Salt Lake Community College and Utah State University, through which students may receive college credit. Bountiful High also offers Advanced Placement (AP) credit, as well as International Baccalaureate courses whose participants can earn an IB Diploma at the end of their senior year of high school.

Sports
BHS competes in 5A sports including soccer, basketball, baseball, wrestling, volleyball, cross country, track and field, golf, tennis, swimming, lacrosse, and football. They share a rivalry with the Woods Cross High School Wildcats and the Viewmont Vikings.

The Braves have a rich history in the student section supporting the athletics. The section is commonly referred to as the BASS. The BASS has been featured on many television programs and social media outlets.

The Braves won back-to-back state football championships in 2002 and 2003. They have also won three state baseball championships in 1981, 1988 and 2014. The boys' baseball team has generated many top players in the state, including back-to-back state MVPs Mark Shaffer (1991) and Brad Beck (1992). Its 1996 team is said to have been one of its best led by all-state players Mike Miller, Zac Jacobs, Matt Shaffer and Nate Weese, who was drafted by the then Montreal Expos in 2002.

The boys' soccer team has won a total of eight state championships, most recently in 2007, 2008, and 2013.

The boys' basketball program at this school has historically been quite notable. Led by longtime coach Mike Maxwell, the Braves won the 2014 and 2015 4A state basketball title. Maxwell, who has been called a cheater for violating district rules against recruiting players from outside school boundaries brought probation and fines to the school after a UHSAA investigation showed he violated the rules. Maxwell's practice of inappropriate recruiting continued into the 2019–2020 season in which three of the five starters were from outside the school boundaries.

The girls' basketball team won the 4A state championship for the 2015–2016 season, only having three losses.

Bountiful won the girls' soccer state championship in 2000, 2003 and 2006.

The girls' tennis team won the state championship in 2003 and 2004.

The Mandonelles (drill team) have won first place at their region for 10 years in a row since 2008 and have won first place state competition in the years 2009, 2010, 2011, 2012, 2013, 2014, 2015, 2017, and 2018. Their "seven-peat" streak was broken in 2016 with Bountiful placing third overall in the state competition.

Notable alumni 

Brady Christensen - NFL offensive lineman for the Carolina Panthers
Jake Gibb - Olympic volleyball player
 Sam Merrill - NBA player for the Milwaukee Bucks
Aaron Roderick - college football coach (BYU)

References

External links
 Bountiful High School homepage
 https://www.ksl.com/article/50058411/bountiful-high-school-to-drop-braves-nickname-after-monthslong-inquiry

Public high schools in Utah
Schools in Davis County, Utah
International Baccalaureate schools in Utah
Buildings and structures in Bountiful, Utah